Mannanur is a village on the banks of Bharathappuzha river in Palakkad district of Kerala state in India.

References

Villages in Palakkad district